Szilvia Lengyel (born 1971) is a Hungarian agrarian engineer and politician, member of the National Assembly (MP) from Politics Can Be Different (LMP) Pest County Regional List from 2012 to 2014.

She became a Member of Parliament on October 8, 2012, replacing Endre Kukorelly who resigned in September 2012. Formerly the LMP's Pest County Board, led by Lengyel, withdrew its confidence from Kukorelly. Szilvia Lengyel was a member of the Committee on Sports and Tourism.

References

1971 births
Living people
Hungarian engineers
Eötvös Loránd University alumni
Women members of the National Assembly of Hungary
LMP – Hungary's Green Party politicians
Members of the National Assembly of Hungary (2010–2014)
People from Debrecen
21st-century Hungarian women politicians